Éamon de Buitléar (22 January 1930 – 27 January 2013) was an Irish writer, musician and film maker. He was managing director of Éamon de Buitléar Ltd., a company which specialises in wildlife filming and television documentaries.

The son of aide-de-camp to the then President of Ireland, Douglas Hyde, he grew up in a house of Irish language speakers in Wicklow. He began his working career in Garnett and Keegan's and Helys, selling fishing gear and shotguns. It was there where he first met Seán Ó Riada.

A 4 km circular walk  or The De Buitléar Way on Bray Head commemorates his life and work, calling out notable flora and fauna in the area. It was inaugurated in May 2014 by his wife Lailí.

Film career 
For many years in the 1960s he was the only independent film producer, with Gerrit van Gelderen, making wildlife programmes, notably the series Amuigh Faoin Spéir (English: "Out Under the Sky") for the Irish television channel,  Telefís Éireann. In 1986, his programme, Cois Farraige leis an Madra Uisce, won him a Jacob's Award. His work includes directing films based on his books, and he received commissions from RTÉ, BBC and other stations.

In 1987, he was nominated by the Taoiseach, Charles Haughey to the 18th Seanad. He was appointed to the Central Fisheries Board in 2005.

Musical career 
De Buitléar was involved in Irish traditional music with Seán Ó Riada and was later involved in the establishment of the traditional music groups Ceoltóirí Chualann (1960–1969) and Ceoltóirí Laighean.

Books 
 
 
  - Reviewed by the Irish Independent

Filmography
 Amuigh Faoin Spéir – television series (RTÉ);
 The Natural World and The Living Isles (BBC);
 Exploring the Landscape – television series (RTÉ);
 Ireland's Wild Countryside – television series (RTÉ);
 A Life in the Wild – television series (RTÉ);
 Wild Islands (RTÉ, S4C and STV);
 Nature Watch (ITV);
 Éiníní and Ainimhithe na hÉireann (TG4).

References

External links

1930 births
2013 deaths
21st-century Irish people
Irish writers
Irish film directors
Irish accordionists
Jacob's Award winners
Members of the 18th Seanad
People from Bray, County Wicklow
Nominated members of Seanad Éireann
Independent members of Seanad Éireann